The Split Program is a split album by German metalcore bands Caliban and Heaven Shall Burn, released on 18 August 2000. "Partisan" is performed by Caliban on the album, but is originally a Heaven Shall Burn composition, while "One More Lie" was composed by Caliban and is covered by Heaven Shall Burn. The intro is a piece of a composition by Wojciech Kilar that is also use in the soundtrack for Bram Stoker's Dracula. Track 6 is an audio clip taken from the 1994 Quentin Tarantino film Pulp Fiction. Caliban have since redone "A Summer Dream" and "One More Lie" on 2005's The Split Program II.

Track listing 

Caliban (band) albums
Heaven Shall Burn albums
2000 albums
Split albums